Karen Hawkins is the name of

 Karen Hawkins (athlete) (born 1957), American sprinter
 Karen Hawkins (author), American author of historical romance novels